This page provides list of most translated individual authors to date sorted by the total number of translations.

See also
List of literary works by number of translations
List of best-selling fiction authors
Index Translationum

References 

Translation-related lists
Most-Translated Authors
Translated